Saadeh Al Shami is an economist, academic and Lebanese politician who has been serving as the deputy prime minister in the cabinet led by Najib Mikati since 10 September 2021.

Biography
Al Shami hails from a Lebanese Greek Orthodox family. From 1987 to 1993 he was the head of the graduate school of business at the American University of Beirut. He worked at the Lebanese premiership and the finance ministry as a head of the reform commission between 2005 and 2006. Then from 2008 to 2013 he worked at the International Monetary Fund in different positions, including the assistant to the director of the Middle East and Central Asia department. Al Shami also served as the head of Capital Markets Authority in Lebanon between 2013 and 2017. In 2018 he began to work as the group chief economist at the National Bank of Kuwait.

He was a member of the Syrian Social Nationalist Party. In the proposed cabinet by Saad Hariri in July 2021 Al Shami was named as the minister of economy, but the cabinet was not approved by the Lebanese Parliament. He was appointed deputy prime minister in the cabinet formed by Prime Minister Najib Mikati on 10 September 2021.

In April 2022 Shami announced that the Banque du Liban, central bank of Lebanon, went bankrupt: "The state has gone bankrupt as did the Banque du Liban, and the loss has occurred, and we will seek to reduce losses for the people."

References

20th-century economists
20th-century Lebanese people
21st-century economists
21st-century Lebanese people
Academic staff of the American University of Beirut
Deputy prime ministers of Lebanon
Government ministers of Lebanon
International Monetary Fund people
Greek Orthodox Christians from Lebanon
Living people
Syrian Social Nationalist Party in Lebanon politicians
Date of birth missing (living people)
Year of birth missing (living people)
Lebanese economists